This article lists the complete results of the group stage of the 2010 Thomas Cup in Kuala Lumpur, Malaysia.

Group A

China vs. Peru

Korea vs. Peru

China vs. Korea

Group B

Malaysia vs. Nigeria

Japan vs. Nigeria

Malaysia vs. Japan

Group C

Denmark vs. Poland

Germany vs. Poland

Denmark vs. Germany

Group D

Indonesia vs. Australia

Indonesia vs. India

India vs. Australia

References

Thomas Cup group stage